An active galactic nucleus (AGN) is a compact region at the center of a galaxy that has a much-higher-than-normal luminosity over at least some portion of the electromagnetic spectrum with characteristics indicating that the luminosity is not produced by stars. Such excess non-stellar emission has been observed in the radio, microwave, infrared, optical, ultra-violet, X-ray and gamma ray wavebands. A galaxy hosting an AGN is called an "active galaxy". The non-stellar radiation from an AGN is theorized to result from the accretion of matter by a supermassive black hole at the center of its host galaxy.

Active galactic nuclei are the most luminous persistent sources of electromagnetic radiation in the universe, and as such can be used as a means of discovering distant objects; their evolution as a function of cosmic time also puts constraints on models of the cosmos.

The observed characteristics of an AGN depend on several properties such as the mass of the central black hole, the rate of gas accretion onto the black hole, the orientation of the accretion disk, the degree of obscuration of the nucleus by dust, and presence or absence of jets.

Numerous subclasses of AGN have been defined based on their observed characteristics; the most powerful AGN are classified as quasars. A blazar is an AGN with a jet pointed toward the Earth, in which radiation from the jet is enhanced by relativistic beaming.

History

During the first half of the 20th century, photographic observations of nearby galaxies detected some characteristic signatures of AGN emission, although there was not yet a physical understanding of the nature of the AGN phenomenon. Some early observations included the first spectroscopic detection of emission lines from the nuclei of NGC 1068 and Messier 81 by Edward Fath (published in 1909), and the discovery of the jet in Messier 87 by Heber Curtis (published in 1918). Further spectroscopic studies by astronomers including Vesto Slipher, Milton Humason, and Nicholas Mayall noted the presence of unusual emission lines in some galaxy nuclei. In 1943, Carl Seyfert published a paper in which he described observations of nearby galaxies having bright nuclei that were sources of unusually broad emission lines.  Galaxies observed as part of this study included NGC 1068, NGC 4151, NGC 3516, and NGC 7469. Active galaxies such as these are known as Seyfert galaxies in honor of Seyfert's pioneering work.

The development of radio astronomy was a major catalyst to understanding AGN. Some of the earliest detected radio sources are nearby active elliptical galaxies  such as Messier 87 and Centaurus A. Another radio source, Cygnus A, was identified by Walter Baade and Rudolph Minkowski as a tidally distorted galaxy with an unusual emission-line spectrum, having a recessional velocity of 16,700 kilometers per second. The 3C radio survey led to further progress in discovery of new radio sources as well as identifying the visible-light sources associated with the radio emission. In photographic images, some of these objects were nearly point-like or quasi-stellar in appearance, and were classified as quasi-stellar radio sources (later abbreviated as "quasars").

Soviet Armenian astrophysicist Viktor Ambartsumian  introduced Active Galactic Nuclei in the early 1950s. At the Solvay Conference on Physics in 1958, Ambartsumian presented a report arguing that "explosions in galactic nuclei cause large amounts of mass to be expelled. For these explosions to occur, galactic nuclei must contain bodies of huge mass and unknown nature. From this point forward Active Galactic Nuclei (AGN) became a key component in theories of galactic evolution." His idea was initially accepted skeptically.

A major breakthrough was the measurement of the redshift of the quasar 3C 273 by Maarten Schmidt, published in 1963.  Schmidt noted that if this object was extragalactic (outside the Milky Way, at a cosmological distance) then its large redshift of 0.158 implied that it was the nuclear region of a galaxy about 100 times more powerful than other radio galaxies that had been identified. Shortly afterward, optical spectra were used to measure the redshifts of a growing number of quasars including 3C 48, even more distant at redshift 0.37.

The enormous luminosities of these quasars as well as their unusual spectral properties indicated that their power source could not be ordinary stars. Accretion of gas onto a supermassive black hole was suggested as the source of quasars' power in papers by Edwin Salpeter and Yakov Zeldovich in 1964. In 1969 Donald Lynden-Bell proposed that nearby galaxies contain supermassive black holes at their centers as relics of "dead" quasars, and that black hole accretion was the power source for the non-stellar emission in nearby Seyfert galaxies.  In the 1960s and 1970s, early X-ray astronomy observations demonstrated that Seyfert galaxies and quasars are powerful sources of X-ray emission, which originates from the inner regions of black hole accretion disks.

Today, AGN are a major topic of astrophysical research, both observational and theoretical.  AGN research encompasses observational surveys to find AGN over broad ranges of luminosity and redshift, examination of the cosmic evolution and growth of black holes, studies of the physics of black hole accretion and the emission of electromagnetic radiation from AGN, examination of the properties of jets and outflows of matter from AGN, and the impact of black hole accretion and quasar activity on galaxy evolution.

Models 

For a long time it has been argued that an AGN must be powered by accretion of mass onto massive black holes (106 to 1010 times the Solar mass). AGN are both compact and persistently extremely luminous. Accretion can potentially give very efficient conversion of potential and kinetic energy to radiation, and a massive black hole has a high Eddington luminosity, and as a result, it can provide the observed high persistent luminosity. Supermassive black holes are now believed to exist in the centres of most if not all massive galaxies since the mass of the black hole correlates well with the velocity dispersion of the galactic bulge (the M–sigma relation) or with bulge luminosity. Thus AGN-like characteristics are expected whenever a supply of material for accretion comes within the sphere of influence of the central black hole.

Accretion disc

In the standard model of AGN, cold material close to a black hole forms an accretion disc. Dissipative processes in the accretion disc transport matter inwards and angular momentum outwards, while causing the accretion disc to heat up. The expected spectrum of an accretion disc peaks in the optical-ultraviolet waveband; in addition, a corona of hot material forms above the accretion disc and can inverse-Compton scatter photons up to X-ray energies. The radiation from the accretion disc excites cold atomic material close to the black hole and this in turn radiates at particular emission lines. A large fraction of the AGN's radiation may be obscured by interstellar gas and dust close to the accretion disc, but (in a steady-state situation) this will be re-radiated at some other waveband, most likely the infrared.

Relativistic jets

Some accretion discs produce jets of twin, highly collimated, and fast outflows that emerge in opposite directions from close to the disc. The direction of the jet ejection is determined either by the angular momentum axis of the accretion disc or the spin axis of the black hole. The jet production mechanism and indeed the jet composition on very small scales are not understood at present due to the resolution of astronomical instruments being too low. The jets have their most obvious observational effects in the radio waveband, where very-long-baseline interferometry can be used to study the synchrotron radiation they emit at resolutions of sub-parsec scales. However, they radiate in all wavebands from the radio through to the gamma-ray range via the synchrotron and the inverse-Compton scattering process, and so AGN jets are a second potential source of any observed continuum radiation.

Radiatively inefficient AGN
There exists a class of "radiatively inefficient" solutions to the equations that govern accretion. Several theories exist, but the most widely known of these is the Advection Dominated Accretion Flow (ADAF).  In this type of accretion, which is important for accretion rates well below the Eddington limit, the accreting matter does not form a thin disc and consequently does not efficiently radiate away the energy that it acquired as it moved close to the black hole. Radiatively inefficient accretion has been used to explain the lack of strong AGN-type radiation from massive black holes at the centres of elliptical galaxies in clusters, where otherwise we might expect high accretion rates and correspondingly high luminosities. Radiatively inefficient AGN would be expected to lack many of the characteristic features of standard AGN with an accretion disc.

Particle acceleration
AGN are a candidate source of high and ultra-high energy cosmic rays (see also Centrifugal mechanism of acceleration).

Observational characteristics
There is no single observational signature of an AGN. The list below covers some of the features that have allowed systems to be identified as AGN.

 Nuclear optical continuum emission. This is visible whenever there is a direct view of the accretion disc. Jets can also contribute to this component of the AGN emission. The optical emission has a roughly power-law dependence on wavelength.
 Nuclear infra-red emission. This is visible whenever the accretion disc and its environment are obscured by gas and dust close to the nucleus and then re-emitted ('reprocessing'). As it is thermal emission, it can be distinguished from any jet or disc-related emission.
 Broad optical emission lines. These come from cold material close to the central black hole. The lines are broad because the emitting material is revolving around the black hole with high speeds causing a range of Doppler shifts of the emitted photons.
 Narrow optical emission lines. These come from more distant cold material, and so are narrower than the broad lines.
 Radio continuum emission. This is always due to a jet. It shows a spectrum characteristic of synchrotron radiation.
 X-ray continuum emission. This can arise both from a jet and from the hot corona of the accretion disc via a scattering process: in both cases it shows a power-law spectrum. In some radio-quiet AGN there is an excess of soft X-ray emission in addition to the power-law component. The origin of the soft X-rays is not clear at present.
 X-ray line emission. This is a result of illumination of cold heavy elements by the X-ray continuum that causes fluorescence of X-ray emission lines, the best-known of which is the iron feature around 6.4 keV. This line may be narrow or broad: relativistically broadened iron lines can be used to study the dynamics of the accretion disc very close to the nucleus and therefore the nature of the central black hole.

Types of active galaxy
It is convenient to divide AGN into two classes, conventionally called radio-quiet and radio-loud. Radio-loud objects have emission contributions from both the jet(s) and the lobes that the jets inflate. These emission contributions dominate the luminosity of the AGN at radio wavelengths and possibly at some or all other wavelengths. Radio-quiet objects are simpler since jet and any jet-related emission can be neglected at all wavelengths.

AGN terminology is often confusing, since the distinctions between different types of AGN sometimes reflect historical differences in how the objects were discovered or initially classified, rather than real physical differences.

Radio-quiet AGN             
 Low-ionization nuclear emission-line regions (LINERs). As the name suggests, these systems show only weak nuclear emission-line regions, and no other signatures of AGN emission. It is debatable whether all such systems are true AGN (powered by accretion on to a supermassive black hole). If they are, they constitute the lowest-luminosity class of radio-quiet AGN. Some may be radio-quiet analogues of the low-excitation radio galaxies (see below).
 Seyfert galaxies. Seyferts were the earliest distinct class of AGN to be identified. They show optical range nuclear continuum emission, narrow and occasionally broad emission lines, occasionally strong nuclear X-ray emission and sometimes a weak small-scale radio jet. Originally they were divided into two types known as Seyfert 1 and 2: Seyfert 1s show strong broad emission lines while Seyfert 2s do not, and Seyfert 1s are more likely to show strong low-energy X-ray emission. Various forms of elaboration on this scheme exist: for example, Seyfert 1s with relatively narrow broad lines are sometimes referred to as narrow-line Seyfert 1s. The host galaxies of Seyferts are usually spiral or irregular galaxies.
 Radio-quiet quasars/QSOs. These are essentially more luminous versions of Seyfert 1s: the distinction is arbitrary and is usually expressed in terms of a limiting optical magnitude. Quasars were originally 'quasi-stellar' in optical images as they had optical luminosities that were greater than that of their host galaxy. They always show strong optical continuum emission, X-ray continuum emission, and broad and narrow optical emission lines. Some astronomers use the term QSO (Quasi-Stellar Object) for this class of AGN, reserving 'quasar' for radio-loud objects, while others talk about radio-quiet and radio-loud quasars. The host galaxies of quasars can be spirals, irregulars or ellipticals. There is a correlation between the quasar's luminosity and the mass of its host galaxy, in that the most luminous quasars inhabit the most massive galaxies (ellipticals).
 'Quasar 2s'. By analogy with Seyfert 2s, these are objects with quasar-like luminosities but without strong optical nuclear continuum emission or broad line emission. They are scarce in surveys, though a number of possible candidate quasar 2s have been identified.

Radio-loud AGN
See main article Radio galaxy for a discussion of the large-scale behaviour of the jets. Here, only the active nuclei are discussed.

 Radio-loud quasars behave exactly like radio-quiet quasars with the addition of emission from a jet. Thus they show strong optical continuum emission, broad and narrow emission lines, and strong X-ray emission, together with nuclear and often extended radio emission.
 “Blazars” (BL Lac objects and OVV quasars) classes are distinguished by rapidly variable, polarized optical, radio and X-ray emission. BL Lac objects show no optical emission lines, broad or narrow, so that their redshifts can only be determined from features in the spectra of their host galaxies. The emission-line features may be intrinsically absent or simply swamped by the additional variable component. In the latter case, emission lines may become visible when the variable component is at a low level. OVV quasars behave more like standard radio-loud quasars with the addition of a rapidly variable component. In both classes of source, the variable emission is believed to originate in a relativistic jet oriented close to the line of sight. Relativistic effects amplify both the luminosity of the jet and the amplitude of variability.
 Radio galaxies. These objects show nuclear and extended radio emission. Their other AGN properties are heterogeneous. They can broadly be divided into low-excitation and high-excitation classes. Low-excitation objects show no strong narrow or broad emission lines, and the emission lines they do have may be excited by a different mechanism. Their optical and X-ray nuclear emission is consistent with originating purely in a jet. They may be the best current candidates for AGN with radiatively inefficient accretion. By contrast, high-excitation objects (narrow-line radio galaxies) have emission-line spectra similar to those of Seyfert 2s. The small class of broad-line radio galaxies, which show relatively strong nuclear optical continuum emission probably includes some objects that are simply low-luminosity radio-loud quasars. The host galaxies of radio galaxies, whatever their emission-line type, are essentially always ellipticals.

Unification of AGN species

Unified models propose that different observational classes of AGN are a single type of physical object observed under different conditions. The currently favoured unified models are 'orientation-based unified models' meaning that they propose that the apparent differences between different types of objects arise simply because of their different orientations to the observer. However, they are debated (see below).

Radio-quiet unification
At low luminosities, the objects to be unified are Seyfert galaxies. The unification models propose that in Seyfert 1s the observer has a direct view of the active nucleus. In Seyfert 2s the nucleus is observed through an obscuring structure which prevents a direct view of the optical continuum, broad-line region or (soft) X-ray emission. The key insight of orientation-dependent accretion models is that the two types of object can be the same if only certain angles to the line of sight are observed. The standard picture is of a torus of obscuring material surrounding the accretion disc. It must be large enough to obscure the broad-line region but not large enough to obscure the narrow-line region, which is seen in both classes of object. Seyfert 2s are seen through the torus. Outside the torus there is material that can scatter some of the nuclear emission into our line of sight, allowing us to see some optical and X-ray continuum and, in some cases, broad emission lines—which are strongly polarized, showing that they have been scattered and proving that some Seyfert 2s really do contain hidden Seyfert 1s. Infrared observations of the nuclei of Seyfert 2s also support this picture.

At higher luminosities, quasars take the place of Seyfert 1s, but, as already mentioned, the corresponding 'quasar 2s' are elusive at present. If they do not have the scattering component of Seyfert 2s they would be hard to detect except through their luminous narrow-line and hard X-ray emission.

Radio-loud unification
Historically, work on radio-loud unification has concentrated on high-luminosity radio-loud quasars. These can be unified with narrow-line radio galaxies in a manner directly analogous to the Seyfert 1/2 unification (but without the complication of much in the way of a reflection component: narrow-line radio galaxies show no nuclear optical continuum or reflected X-ray component, although they do occasionally show polarized broad-line emission). The large-scale radio structures of these objects provide compelling evidence that the orientation-based unified models really are true. X-ray evidence, where available, supports the unified picture: radio galaxies show evidence of obscuration from a torus, while quasars do not, although care must be taken since radio-loud objects also have a soft unabsorbed jet-related component, and high resolution is necessary to separate out thermal emission from the sources' large-scale hot-gas environment. At very small angles to the line of sight, relativistic beaming dominates, and we see a blazar of some variety.

However, the population of radio galaxies is completely dominated by low-luminosity, low-excitation objects. These do not show strong nuclear emission lines—broad or narrow—they have optical continua which appear to be entirely jet-related, and their X-ray emission is also consistent with coming purely from a jet, with no heavily absorbed nuclear component in general. These objects cannot be unified with quasars, even though they include some high-luminosity objects when looking at radio emission, since the torus can never hide the narrow-line region to the required extent, and since infrared studies show that they have no hidden nuclear component: in fact there is no evidence for a torus in these objects at all. Most likely, they form a separate class in which only jet-related emission is important. At small angles to the line of sight, they will appear as BL Lac objects.

Criticism of the radio-quiet unification
In the recent literature on AGN, being subject to an intense debate, an increasing set of observations appear to be in conflict with some of the key predictions of the Unified Model, e.g. that each Seyfert 2 has an obscured Seyfert 1 nucleus (a hidden broad-line region).

Therefore, one cannot know whether the gas in all Seyfert 2 galaxies is ionized due to photoionization from a single, non-stellar continuum source in the center or due to shock-ionization from e.g. intense, nuclear starbursts. Spectropolarimetric studies reveal that only 50% of Seyfert 2s show a hidden broad-line region and thus split Seyfert 2 galaxies into two populations. The two classes of populations appear to differ by their luminosity, where the Seyfert 2s without a hidden broad-line region are generally less luminous. This suggests absence of broad-line region is connected to low Eddington ratio, and not to obscuration.

The covering factor of the torus might play an important role. Some torus models predict how Seyfert 1s and Seyfert 2s can obtain different covering factors from a luminosity- and accretion rate- dependence of the torus covering factor, something supported by studies in the x-ray of AGN. The models also suggest an accretion-rate dependence of the broad-line region and provide a natural evolution from more active engines in Seyfert 1s to more “dead” Seyfert 2s and can explain the observed break-down of the unified model at low luminosities and the evolution of the broad-line region.

While studies of single AGN show important deviations from the expectations of the unified model, results from statistical tests have been contradictory. The most important short-coming of statistical tests by direct comparisons of statistical samples of Seyfert 1s and Seyfert 2s is the introduction of selection biases due to anisotropic selection criteria.

Studying neighbour galaxies rather than the AGN themselves first suggested the numbers of neighbours were larger for Seyfert 2s than for Seyfert 1s, in contradiction with the Unified Model. Today, having overcome the previous limitations of small sample sizes and anisotropic selection, studies of neighbours of hundreds to thousands of AGN have shown that the neighbours of Seyfert 2s are intrinsically dustier and more star-forming than Seyfert 1s and a connection between AGN type, host galaxy morphology and collision history. Moreover, angular clustering studies of the two AGN types confirm that they reside in different environments and show that they reside within dark matter halos of different masses. The AGN environment studies are in line with evolution-based unification models where Seyfert 2s transform into Seyfert 1s during merger, supporting earlier models of merger-driven activation of Seyfert 1 nuclei.

While controversy about the soundness of each individual study still prevails, they all agree on that the simplest viewing-angle based models of AGN Unification are incomplete. Seyfert-1 and Seyfert-2 seem to differ in star formation and AGN engine power.

While it still might be valid that an obscured Seyfert 1 can appear as a Seyfert 2, not all Seyfert 2s must host an obscured Seyfert 1. Understanding whether it is the same engine driving all Seyfert 2s, the connection to radio-loud AGN, the mechanisms of the variability of some AGN that vary between the two types at very short time scales, and the connection of the AGN type to small- and large-scale environment remain important issues to incorporate into any unified model of active galactic nuclei.

A study of Swift/BAT AGN published in July 2022

adds support to the "radiation-regulated unification model" outlined in 2017.
 In this model, the relative accretion rate (termed the "Eddington ratio") of the black hole has a significant impact on the observed features of the AGN. Black Holes with higher Eddington ratios appear to be more likely to be unobscured, having cleared away locally obscuring material in a very short timescale.

Cosmological uses and evolution
For a long time, active galaxies held all the records for the highest-redshift objects known either in the optical or the radio spectrum, because of their high luminosity. They still have a role to play in studies of the early universe, but it is now recognised that an AGN gives a highly biased picture of the "typical" high-redshift galaxy.

Most luminous classes of AGN (radio-loud and radio-quiet) seem to have been much more numerous in the early universe. This suggests  that massive black holes formed early on and that the conditions for the formation of luminous AGN were more common in the early universe, such as a much higher availability of cold gas near the centre of galaxies than at present. It also implies that many objects that were once luminous quasars are now much less luminous, or entirely quiescent. The evolution of the low-luminosity AGN population is much less well understood due to the difficulty of observing these objects at high redshifts.

See also

References

External links
 

Astronomical classification systems
 
Concepts in astronomy